"The Above Ground Sound" of Jake Holmes is the debut album of American singer songwriter Jake Holmes, released in June 1967 on Tower Records. The album consists of songs played on bass and two electric guitars with no drummer. Both this record and Holmes' subsequent record, A Letter to Katherine December, were not well received and neither made the charts. Holmes played guitar. Tim Irwin also played guitar with Rick Randle on bass.

"Dazed and Confused"
The album is best known for the song "Dazed and Confused" because Led Zeppelin released their interpretation of the song on their 1969 debut album Led Zeppelin.  Page was familiar with Holmes' song because his previous band, The Yardbirds, had covered the song. The Led Zeppelin song was not credited to Jake Holmes.  While Holmes took no action at the time, he did later contact Jimmy Page in regards to the matter but received no reply. In June 2010, Holmes filed a lawsuit against the guitarist for copyright infringement in a United States District Court, claiming Page knowingly copied his work. The lawsuit was settled out of court, with future Led Zeppelin releases crediting "Dazed and Confused" to "By Page – Inspired by Jake Holmes.", and the case was permanently closed.

Track listing
All tracks composed by Jake Holmes

Side one
"Lonely" – 2:38
"Did You Know" – 2:52
"She Belongs to Me" – 2:15
"Too Long" – 2:47
"Genuine Imitation Life" – 4:00

Side two
"Dazed and Confused" – 3:53
"Penny's" – 2:39
"Hard to Keep My Mind on You" – 2:01
"Wish I Was Anywhere Else" – 2:50
"Signs of Age" – 4:02

Personnel
Jake Holmes - guitar, vocals
Tim Irwin - guitar (uncredited)
Rick Randall - bass (uncredited)

References

1967 debut albums
Jake Holmes albums
Tower Records albums